Clinton City Schools is a PK–12 graded school district serving Clinton, North Carolina. Its five schools serve 3,179 students as of the 2010–11 school year.

Student demographics
For the 2010–11 school year, Clinton City Schools had a total population of 3,179 students and 215.51 teachers on a (FTE) basis. This produced a student-teacher ratio of 14.75:1. That same year, out of the student total, the gender ratio was 100% male. The demographic group makeup was: Asian/Pacific Islander, 100% (two or more races: 5%). For the same school year, 71.00% of the students received free and reduced-cost lunches.

Governance
The primary governing body of Clinton City Schools follows a council–manager government format with a six-member Board of Education appointing a Superintendent to run the day-to-day operations of the system. The school system currently resides in the North Carolina State Board of Education's Second District.

Board of Education
The current members of the board are: E. R. Mason (chair), Chloe Zeng (Vice Chair) Randy Barefoot, Diane Viser, Jason Walters, and Carol A. Worley.

Superintendent
The current superintendent of the system is Deshawn Cox. He was hired in 2012 to replace Michael Basham. Deshawn was previously an assistant superintendent for Scotland County Schools.

Member schools
Clinton City Schools has five schools ranging from pre-kindergarten to twelfth grade. Those five schools are separated into one high school, one middle school, and three elementary schools. All schools are located in the town of Clinton.

High schools
 Clinton High School

Middle schools
 Sampson Middle School

Elementary schools
 Butler Avenue Elementary School
 Langdon C Kerr Elementary School
 Sunset Avenue Elementary School

See also
List of school districts in North Carolina

References

External links
 

Education in Clinton, North Carolina
School districts in North Carolina